Merta  (German: Merta Bach) is a creek in Šumperk District, Moravia, a right tributary of the Desná. 
Its length is 16.6 km and its drainage basin covers 74.5 km2. The mean annual discharge at its mouth is 1.20 m³/s.

The Merta originates from the southeast slope of Vřesník peak in High Ash Mountains, 1200 meters above sea level.

Upper reaches have a character of mountain torrent flowing through steep meadows.  Dead trees are in watercourse and banks keep its natural character.

Then The Merta goes through the villages of Vernířovice, Sobotín and Petrov nad Desnou, where the creek is partially canalized. The Merta feeds two nameless pounds in Petrov nad Desnou, of 0.5 ha and 0.3 ha.

The creek mouths into Desná in the northern part of Rapotín.

References

Rivers of the Olomouc Region